Henry Cloud is an American Christian self help author.  Cloud co-authored  Boundaries: When to Say Yes, How to Say No to Take Control of Your Life in 1992 which sold two million copies and evolved into a five-part series.

Cloud is president of Cloud-Townsend Resources and runs a private practice with his partner, John Townsend in Newport Beach, California. Cloud and Townsend formerly co-directed the Minirth-Meier Clinic West in the same area of Orange County.  Cloud has a BS in psychology with honors from Southern Methodist University and a PhD in clinical psychology from Biola University (1987). He also took classes from Talbot Theological Seminary.

See also 
 Personal boundaries

References

Living people
1956 births
Biola University alumni
Southern Methodist University alumni